Pseudotsuga sinensis (Chinese Douglas-fir; in Chinese 黃杉, pinyin romanization: huáng shān) is a species of conifer in the family Pinaceae. It is a tree up to 50 metres tall. It is found in China (in Anhui, Fujian, Guangxi, Guizhou, Hubei, Hunan, Jiangxi, Shaanxi, Sichuan, Yunnan, and Zhejiang provinces) and Taiwan as well as in northernmost parts of Vietnam.

The timber is used for construction, bridge building, furniture, and wood fiber.

Pseudotsuga sinensis var. wilsoniana, Taiwan Douglas-fir, is sometimes treated as its own species, Pseudotsuga wilsoniana. This variety is geographically isolated (being restricted to Taiwan) but is not markedly distinct morphologically from var. sinensis of China.

References

sinensis
Vulnerable plants
Trees of China
Trees of Taiwan
Trees of Vietnam
Forestry in China
Taxonomy articles created by Polbot